Dungeons & Dragons: Chronicles of Mystara (ダンジョンズ＆ドラゴンズ ―ミスタラ英雄戦記―) is a 2013 video game compilation by Capcom released as a digital download for the PlayStation 3, Wii U, Windows (via Steam), and Xbox 360. It includes two arcade games based on the Dungeons & Dragons franchise: Dungeons & Dragons: Tower of Doom (1994) and Dungeons & Dragons: Shadow over Mystara (1996).

Release
The game was released on August 22, 2013. The Japanese version of the game, exclusive to the PlayStation 3 and having a retail release, was developed internally at Capcom by the original team, and features more accurate emulation than the worldwide release plus exclusive content.

Reception

Dungeons & Dragons: Chronicles of Mystara was positively received by critics. Review aggregating website Metacritic gave the PC version 80/100, the PlayStation 3 version 83/100, and the Xbox 360 version 77/100. Reviewing the Xbox 360 version, Rob Kershaw at The Digital Fix gave the game 8/10 noting that while the graphics and music have become dated since the original arcade releases in the 1990s, the port was faithful to the source and the development team had added plenty of extras to increase the game's longevity. Erik Kain of Forbes opined: "It plays a bit like Double Dragon, the old Ninja Turtles games, or any of the other classic NES/SEGA side-scrolling brawlers, so if you're a fan of the genre or of classic D&D, the $15 Capcom is charging for Chronicles is going to be well worth it."

See also
Dungeons & Dragons Collection

References

External links
 (archived) 

2013 video games
Action role-playing video games
Capcom beat 'em ups
Capcom video game compilations
Cooperative video games
Dungeons & Dragons video games
Iron Galaxy games
Multiplayer and single-player video games
Mystara
PlayStation 3 games
PlayStation Network games
Role-playing video games
Side-scrolling beat 'em ups
Video games developed in Japan
Video games developed in the United States
Windows games
Wii U eShop games
Xbox 360 Live Arcade games